Morelos also known as El Estero is a community located in Nuevo Laredo Municipality in the Mexican state of Tamaulipas.  According to the INEGI Census of 2010, Morelos has a population of 96 inhabitants, 54 males and 42 females. Its elevation is 164 meters above sea level.

References 

Populated places in Tamaulipas
Laredo–Nuevo Laredo